Velalar College of Engineering and Technology is an engineering college located at Thindal, Erode district in the state of Tamil Nadu in India. The College is affiliated to Anna University, approved by All India Council of Technical Education (AICTE), accredited 'A' Grade by National Assessment and Accreditation Council and five programmes (B.E. – BME, CSE, ECE, EEE and B.Tech.-IT) are accredited by National Board of Accreditation (NBA).

Courses
Eight degrees are offered in B.E./B.Tech. They are:

 B.E. Bio-Medical Engineering
 B.E. Computer Science Engineering
 B.E. Civil Engineering
 B.E. Electronics and Communication Engineering
 B.E. Electrical and Electronics Engineering
 B.E. Mechanical Engineering
 B.Tech. Information Technology
 B.E. Medical Electronics

Six postgraduate degrees are offered including four M.E. programmes. They are :

 M.E. Computer Science and Engineering 
 M.E. VLSI Design
 M.E. Applied Electronics
 M.E. Embedded System Technologies 
 Master of Business Administration (MBA)
 Master of Computer Application (MCA).

Admissions 
Admission is through Tamil Nadu Engineering Admission based on ranking on 12th standard exam results facilitated by Directorate Of Technical Education. M.B.A., M.C.A. and M.E. admissions are based on ranking in TANCET examination conducted by Anna University.

Library
The central library was established in the year 2001 with a total area of 1197.86 sq.m.

Training and Placement
The Training and Placement Cell was established to arrange campus interviews with organizations for placement of final year students, and arranges industrial training for students. Campus placement training (HR, Technical, GD, Written Test) is given in the pre-final year for all eligible candidates.

Accommodation 
The college has on-campus hostel facilities for both boys and girls separately.

References

External links
 

Engineering colleges in Tamil Nadu
Colleges affiliated to Anna University
Universities and colleges in Erode district